Papitashvili Valley is a hanging valley between Wendler Spur and Besson Spur in the Apocalypse Peaks of Victoria Land. The valley opens north to Barwick Valley opposite Hourglass Lake and is ice free but for a glacier at the headwall. Named after Vladimir O. Papitashvili, Space Physics Research Laboratory, University of Michigan, Ann Arbor, member of a joint US-Russian project to collect magnetometer data in the Mirny to Vostok Station area; four seasons, 1994–99; Program Manager for Aeronomy and Astrophysics, Office of Polar Programs, NSF, 2002- .

References

Valleys of Victoria Land